Nearest-neighbor interpolation (also known as proximal interpolation or, in some contexts, point sampling) is a simple method of multivariate interpolation in one or more dimensions.

Interpolation is the problem of approximating the value of a function for a non-given point in some space when given the value of that function in points around (neighboring) that point. The nearest neighbor algorithm selects the value of the nearest point and does not consider the values of neighboring points at all, yielding a piecewise-constant interpolant.  The algorithm is very simple to implement and is commonly used (usually along with mipmapping) in real-time 3D rendering to select color values for a textured surface.

Connection to Voronoi diagram
For a given set of points in space, a Voronoi diagram is a decomposition of space into cells, one for each given point, so that anywhere in space, the closest given point is inside the cell. This is equivalent to nearest neighbour interpolation, by assigning the function value at the given point to all the points inside the cell. The figures on the right side show by colour the shape of the cells.

See also
 Interpolation
 Natural neighbor interpolation
 Image scaling
 Nearest neighbor search
 Zero-order hold
 Rounding

Interpolation
Multivariate interpolation
Texture filtering